Joe Scigliano (born April 18, 1977) is a Canadian former soccer player who played in the USL A-League, National Professional Soccer League, and the Vancouver Metro Soccer League.

Playing career 
Scigliano played at the youth level in England with Stoke City F.C. In 1996, he returned to Canada to sign with the Vancouver 86ers in the USL A-League. After three seasons with Vancouver he played indoor soccer with Philadelphia KiXX in the National Professional Soccer League. In the 2001/2002 season he won the league championship. In 2004, he played with the Columbus Clan F.C. in the Vancouver Metro Soccer League, where he won the VMSL Golden Boot Award. In 2007, he won the British Columbia Provincial Soccer Championship, and also reached the finals of the Open Canada Cup.

International career 
He made his debut for the Canada men's national under-20 soccer team on April 15, 1996 against Trinidad and Tobago at the 1996 CONCACAF U-20 Tournament.

References 

1977 births
Living people
Canadian soccer players
Vancouver Whitecaps (1986–2010) players
Vancouver Columbus players
Philadelphia KiXX (NPSL) players
Philadelphia KiXX players
A-League (1995–2004) players
National Professional Soccer League (1984–2001) players
Major Indoor Soccer League (2001–2008) players
Soccer people from British Columbia
Association football forwards